The Harvey-Niemeyer House, in Florence, Arizona, is a one-story house built around 1874.  It was listed on the National Register of Historic Places in 1986, as a result of a study of historic resources in the Florence area.

It was built first as a "T"-shaped adobe house, which was probably flat-roofed, with an attached front porch and a rear frame addition, around 1874.  It was renovated in 1892 with addition of a hipped roof and a veneer of fired brick on all but the rear facade.  It was expanded also with a row of rooms across its rear in 1936. 

It was deemed significant as "an outstanding example of a local architectural type known as 'Early Transitional.' Early Transitional buildings manifest characteristics of both Sonoran and American Victorian styles. The building is also associated with two locally significant individuals: Dr. William Harvey, M.D., and Charles H. Niemeyer."  It was judged to be comparable to the best examples of Early Transitional style in the National Register-listed Florence Townsite Historic District.

It is located outside that district at 250 S. Main St., but when it was listed its address was 1618 Main St.

It is a one-story house built of adobe around 1874. It was remodeled in 1892 and expanded in 1936.

It was home of physician William Harvey, who became known as an "Angel of Mercy" during a smallpox epidemic.  Harvey also came to address the aftermath of the 1888 Gabriel-Phy shootout.  Charles Niemeyer, a later homeowner, served as a postmaster and, for 25 years, as Clerk of the Pinal County Board of Supervisors.

Notes

References

National Register of Historic Places in Pinal County, Arizona
Buildings and structures completed in 1875